Offspring is an Australian television comedy-drama program that aired Network Ten from 2010 to 2017. Offspring is centred on 30-something obstetrician Nina Proudman and her family and friends as they navigate the chaos of modern life. Filmed in Melbourne's inner north, the series mixes conventional narrative drama and comedy with flashbacks, graphic animation, and fantasy sequences.

Series overview

Cast

Main

Supporting cast
 Adrienne Pickering as Kirsty Crewe (Series 7)
 Neil Melville as Drew Crewe (Series 7)
 Dan Wyllie as Angus Freeman (Series 6)
 Sarah Peirse as Marjorie Van Dyke (Series 6–7)
 Shannon Berry as Brody Jordan (Series 6–7)
 Ash Ricardo as Kerry Green (Series 6–7)
 Cate Wolfe as Jess (Series 5–7)
 Isabella Monaghan as Zoe Proudman-Reid (Series 5–7)
 Maude Davey as Dr. Nadine Samir-Noonan (Series 2, 4–5)
 Celia Pacquola as Ange Navarro (Series 4–5)
 Garry McDonald as Phillip Noonan (Series 3–5)
 Clare Bowditch as Rosanna Harding (Series 3–5)
 Kate Jenkinson as Kate Reid (Series 2–4, 5)
 Christopher Morris as Brendan Wright (Series 1, 5)
 Lawrence Leung as Elvis Kwan (Series 4–7)
 Caren Pistorius as Eloise Ward (Series 4)
 Kevin Hofbauer as Joseph Green (Series 4)
 David Roberts as Phil D'Arabont (Series 2, 4, 5, 6)
 Kate Atkinson as Renee (Series 1–3)
 Kick Gurry as Adam (Series 3)
 Dan Spielman as Andrew Holland (Series 2-3)
 Emma Griffin as Tammy (Series 2)
 Jay Ryan as Fraser King (Series 2)
 Tina Bursill as Marilyn Holland (Series 2)
 Leah de Niese as Odile (Series 1–2)
 Marta Kaczmarek as Sonja (Series 1)
 Kate Box as Alice Havel (Series 1)
 John Wood as Gareth (Series 1)
 Damon Herriman as Boyd Carlisle (Series 1)

Production
Debra Oswald wrote the series with John Edwards and Imogen Banks producing with Southern Star Entertainment. Offspring was originally conceived as a two-hour telemovie for Ten, but was spun off into a 13 episode series after television executives were impressed by the quality of the telemovie. The second season began on 16 May 2011 with a double episode premiere.

On 3 October 2014, shortly after the fifth series finale aired, John Edwards confirmed that Offspring would not return for a sixth series due to Ten's cost-cutting measures in its production division. In 2015, the series was picked up for another series, with production commencing on 25 April 2016 and running through to June 2016. Most of the original cast returned alongside new cast members.
 The seventh series filmed in Melbourne from March 2017 and  premiered on 28 June 2017.

In November 2017, Network Ten chose not to renew the show as part of its 2018 season, although did not officially cancel the program.

The series was filmed in Melbourne's inner-north around the suburb of Fitzroy and was produced by John Edwards and Imogen Banks, who also co-produced Tangle. John Edwards was responsible for such successes as Police Rescue, The Secret Life of Us, Love My Way, and Dangerous - also produced with Imogen Banks - and Rush for Seriously Ten.

Offspring: The Nurses

A web series titled Offspring: The Nurses began in 2010 on the official Offspring website. It follows nurses Kim (Alicia Gardiner) and Zara (Jane Harber) from the original series, and also stars Benedict Hardie, Julia Grace, Laura Gilham, Carl Nilsson Polias, Jodie Sheehy, and Matthew Heyward as fellow staff members of the hospital. Some cast members from the original series have also starred as well.

A second web series follows Zara (Jane Harber), and this time Justina Noble as Nurse Tyra. Series 2 also starred Benedict Hardie, Harry Milas, Josh Price, Natalie Kaplan, Sonja Kowanjko, and Kate Hopkins, while Richard Davies and Lachy Hulme also made guest appearances.

Awards and nominations

Australian Film Institute Awards

TV Week Logie Awards

Equity Ensemble Awards

Series viewership

Episodes

DVD releases
The entire series of Offspring has been released on Region 4 DVD via Madman Entertainment. The first and second seasons were released in 2010 and 2011 respectively in box set packaging. In 2012, both sets received a re-release in standard-case packaging, which became the norm for each subsequent season set. Multiple season sets have additionally been made available from Madman Entertainment.

International distribution
Offspring is in broadcast in several countries around the world, including New Zealand, where it was screened since 2010 on TV One Sundays at 8:30pm. In 2012, it appeared on the GNT network in Brazil and both HOT VOD and HOT3 in Israel, while it was included on Netflix in the United States in 2017. 

Many countries in Europe aired the series, where in 2011 it was picked up by Sony Entertainment Television in Spain, under the title "Descubriendo a Nina", AXN White in Portugal, as "Descobrindo Nina", and by the TLC network for Norway, Netherlands in July, Russia, screening on Sundays, and Sweden, where it was aired on Thursdays at 9:00pm, while in 2012, it debuted on RTÉ One and is available on in Ireland in a late Sunday night time slot, 2013 on YLE TV2 in Finland Mondays at 10:05pm, and additionally, it appeared in the United Kingdom on Netflix in 2017.

References

External links
Offspring at the Australian Television Information Archive

Network 10 original programming
Australian comedy-drama television series
2010 Australian television series debuts
2017 Australian television series endings
Television series by Endemol Australia
Television series by Endemol
Television shows set in Melbourne
English-language television shows
Fitzroy, Victoria